Michele Marchetti (born September 27, 1994) is an Italian ice hockey player for HCB South Tyrol and the Italian national team.

He participated at the 2017 IIHF World Championship.

References

External links

1994 births
Living people
Italian ice hockey forwards
Sportspeople from Trento
Bolzano HC players
SHC Fassa players
HC Gardena players
HC Alleghe players